This is a list of philosophy-related events in the 13th century.

Events

Publications 
 Nasirean Ethics by Nasir al-Din al-Tusi

Births 
 Nasir al-Din al-Tusi (12011274), Persian polymath
 Abner of Burgos (12701347). Jewish philosopher who converted to Christianity, and polemical writer.

Deaths

See also
List of centuries in philosophy

References 
Sir Anthony Kenny. An Illustrated Brief History of Western Philosophy. Second Edition. Blackwell Publishing. 2006. Chapter 8. Page 144 et seq.

Medieval philosophy
Philosophy by century